This is a summary of 1925 in music in the United Kingdom.

Events
 3 April – Gustav Holst's opera At the Boar's Head is premiered in Manchester.
date unknown
After a spell of ill-health, Gustav Holst returns to teach at St Paul's Girls' School.
William Walton dedicates the score of his Portsmouth Point to his patron Siegfried Sassoon, who had recommended it be published by Oxford University Press.

Popular music
Mai Jones – "Blackbirds"

Classical music: new works
Frank Bridge –
"Golden Hair", for voice and piano
"Journey's End", for tenor or high baritone and piano
The Pneu World, for cello and piano
Songs of Rabindranath Tagore (3), for voice and piano, or voice and orchestra
Vignettes de Marseille, for piano
Winter Pastorale, for piano
Eric Coates – 2 Light Syncopated Pieces
Walford Davies – Men and Angels, for chorus and orchestra, Op. 51 
Frederick Delius – A Late Lark, for voice and orchestra
Edward Elgar –
"The Herald", part-song
"The Prince of Sleep", part-song
Gustav Holst –
"God Is Love, His the Care", for choir
Hymns (4) for Songs of Praise, for choir
Motets (2), for choir
Ode to C.K.S. and the Oriana, for choir
Terzetto, for flute, oboe, and viola
Herbert Howells – Piano Concerto No. 2
John Ireland – Two Pieces for Piano (1925)
Ernest John Moeran – Bank Holiday
Ralph Vaughan Williams – 
Concerto Accademico for violin and strings 
Flos Campi, for viola, wordless choir, and small orchestra
Hymns (5) for Songs of Praise, for choir
Two Poems by Seumas O'Sullivan, for voice and piano
Three Songs from Shakespeare, for voice and piano
Three Poems by Walt Whitman, for baritone and piano 
William Walton – Portsmouth Point, concert overture
Peter Warlock – "A Prayer to St Anthony"

Opera
Armstrong Gibbs – Blue Peter
Gustav Holst – At the Boar's Head

Musical theatre
Betty in Mayfair, with music by Harold Fraser-Simson and lyrics by Harry Graham
Charlot's Revue of 1925
Dear Little Billie, with music by H.B. Hedley & Jack Strachey and lyrics by Desmond Carter
Love's Prisoner with music, book and lyrics by Reginald Hargreaves
On with the Dance, written and composed by Noël Coward and Philip Braham

Publications
William Wallace – Richard Wagner as he lived

Births
17 February – Ron Goodwin, film composer (d. 2003)
8 March – Dennis Lotis, South African-born singer (d. 2023)
22 March – Gerard Hoffnung, cartoonist, comedian, musician (d. 1959)
23 March – Monica Sinclair, operatic contralto (d. 2002)
18 June – Johnny Pearson, composer, orchestra leader and pianist (d. 2011)
16 July - Johnny Brandon, singer-songwriter (d. 2017)
2 September – Russ Conway, pianist (d. 2000)
20 September – James Bernard, film composer (d. 2001)
1 October – Alan Styler, operatic baritone (d. 1970)
11 October – David Hughes, operatic tenor (d. 1972)
31 December – Daphne Oram, composer and electronic musician (d. 2003)

Deaths
1 March - Thomas Bidgood, conductor, composer and arranger, 66 (suicide)
22 March – Marie Brema, concert mezzo-soprano, 69
1 April - Francis William Davenport, composer and music writer
13 November – Edward Frank Lambert, composer (born 1868)

See also
 1925 in the United Kingdom
 List of British films of 1925

References

British Music, 1925 in
Music
British music by year
1920s in British music